Robert Wanbon (16 November 1943 – 8 November 2022) is a Welsh dual-code international rugby union, and professional rugby league footballer who played in the 1960s and 1970s.

Background
Wanbon was born in Port Talbot, Wales.

Playing career

International honours
Wanbon won a cap for Wales (RU) while at Aberavon in 1968 against England on Saturday 20 January 1968, scoring a try.

He was one of four Aberavon RFC players in the Welsh team that day, the others were Billy Mainwaring, Maxwell Lloyd Wiltshire and Paul James Wheeler.

He won caps for Wales (RL) while at Warrington in the 1975 Rugby League World Cup against England, Australia, and New Zealand.

Challenge Cup Final appearances
Bobby Wanbon played right-, i.e. number 10, in Warrington's 24-9 victory over Featherstone Rovers in the 1974 Challenge Cup Final during the 1973–74 season at Wembley Stadium, London on Saturday 11 May 1974, in front of a crowd of 77,400, and played right- in the 7-14 defeat by Widnes in the 1975 Challenge Cup Final during the 1974–75 season at Wembley Stadium, London on Saturday 10 May 1975, in front of a crowd of 85,998.

BBC2 Floodlit Trophy Final appearances
Bobby Wanbon did not play (Dave Wright or Gilly Wright played right-) in Warrington's 0-0 draw with Salford in the 1974 BBC2 Floodlit Trophy Final during the 1974–75 season at The Willows, Salford on Tuesday 17 December 1974, and played right-, i.e. number 10, in the 5-10 defeat by Salford in the 1974 BBC2 Floodlit Trophy Final replay during the 1974–75 season at Wilderspool Stadium, Warrington on Tuesday 28 January 1975.

Player's No.6 Trophy Final appearances
Bobby Wanbon played right-, i.e. number 12, in Warrington's 27-16 victory over Rochdale Hornets in the 1973–74 Player's No.6 Trophy Final during the 1973–74 season at Central Park, Wigan on Saturday 9 February 1974.

Captain Morgan Trophy Final appearances
Bobby Wanbon played left-, i.e. number 11, in Warrington's 4-0 victory over Featherstone Rovers in the 1973–74 Captain Morgan Trophy Final during the 1973–74 season at The Willows, Salford on Saturday 26 January 1974, in front of a crowd of 5,259.

Club career
Bobby Wanbon signed for St. Helens (RL) from Aberavon (RU) nine-days after appearing for Wales (RU) against England (RU), for a signing-on fee of £4500 (based on increases in average earnings, this would be approximately £124,400 in 2013).

Death
Bobby Wanbon died on 8 November 2022 in Tenerife, Spain.

References

External links
Profile at saints.org.uk
(archived by web.archive.org) Beryl's Swinging Sixties
Warrington's World Cup heroes – Bobby Wanbon
Statistics at wolvesplayers.thisiswarrington.co.uk

1943 births
2022 deaths
Aberavon RFC players
Dual-code rugby internationals
Rugby league players from Port Talbot
Rugby league props
Rugby league second-rows
Rugby union number eights
Rugby union players from Port Talbot
St Helens R.F.C. players
Wales international rugby union players
Wales national rugby league team players
Warrington Wolves players
Welsh rugby league players
Welsh rugby union players